Tendu Kheda is a town and a Nagar Panchayat in Damoh district in the Indian state of Madhya Pradesh.

Demographics

As of the 2011 Census of India, Tendu Kheda had a population of 16,832.

References

Narsinghpur